Johann Sylvan (died 23 December 1572) was a Reformed German theologian who was executed for his heretical Antitrinitarian beliefs.

Origins and early career
Johann Sylvan probably came from the Etsch valley in the County of Tyrol. By 1555 he was employed as a preacher by the bishop of Würzburg. In 1559 he fled Würzburg and joined the Lutheran church in Tübingen. In 1560 he became a minister in Calw.

Reformed pastor
In 1563 he entered the service of the Reformed Elector Frederick III of the Electorate of the Palatinate. During the same year he became pastor and church superintendent of Kaiserslautern. In 1566 Sylvanus took part in a diplomatic mission to the Netherlands. From 1567 Sylvanus became pastor in Ladenburg and was emerging as a prominent figure within the Palatine church. The Palatinate would be rocked by controversy in 1568 on the question of church discipline, and Sylvan along with his friends Thomas Erastus and Adam Neuser emerged as leaders of the anti-disciplinist faction against Calvinists such as Caspar Olevianus.

Antitrinitarian
Sylvan was asked by Jan Łasicki to refute a work by the Italian Antitrinitarian Giorgio Biandrata. The attempt to refute Biandrata’s treatise only convinced him of the veracity of Biandrata’s arguments, especially when the famed Hebrew scholar Immanuel Tremellius could offer him no support of the doctrine of the Trinity from the Old Testament.

Sylvan became part of an Antitrinitarian cell that included Adam Neuser, Matthias Vehe-Glirius, Jakob Suter and Johann Hasler. In 1570 John Sylvan wrote an Antitrinitarian manifesto entitled True Christian Confession of the Ancient Faith of the One True God and of Messiah Jesus of the True Christ, against the Three-Person Idol and the Two-Natured False Deity of the Antichrist.

Sylvan and Neuser attempted to migrate to Transylvania. Their letter to the Transylvanian prince was discovered and Sylvan – who unlike Adam Neuser was unable to flee – was arrested. Although Johann Sylvan later recanted his Unitarian faith, he was condemned and beheaded on the Heidelberg marketplace.

Elector Frederick’s own compromised confessional position, as an advocate of the theoretically illegal Reformed faith, created the context in which the Palatine court felt it had no other choice than to execute Sylvan and thus demonstrate the state’s theological orthodoxy.

References
 
 Christopher J. Burchill. The Heidelberg Antitrinitarians [Bibliotheca Dissidentium no. 11], ed. André Séguenny. Baden-Baden: Editions Valentin Koerner, 1989.
 Curt Horn. “Johann Sylvan und die Anfänge des Heidelberger Antitrinitarismus.” Neue Heidelberger Jahrbücher 17 (1913): 219-310.
 

1572 deaths
Antitrinitarians
16th-century Christian martyrs
16th-century Austrian people
Executed Austrian people
People executed for heresy
German Unitarians
German Calvinist and Reformed ministers
16th-century Calvinist and Reformed ministers
People executed in the Holy Roman Empire by decapitation
Year of birth unknown
Unitarian Church of Transylvania
16th-century executions in the Holy Roman Empire